Caryocolum horoscopa is a moth of the family Gelechiidae. It is found in India (Kashmir), Afghanistan and Turkey.

The length of the forewings is 5–6 mm. The forewings are grey densely speckled with white. There is a black streak from the fold to the costa at one-quarter and a black medial spot costad of the cell. Furthermore, there is a black comma-shaped spot distad of the cell at three-fifths. These markings are sometimes lined with orange-brown. Adults have been recorded on wing from July to early August.

References

Moths described in 1926
horoscopa
Moths of Asia